Hwang Jeong-dae (born 14 September 1940) is a South Korean athlete. He competed in the men's triple jump at the 1964 Summer Olympics.

References

1940 births
Living people
Athletes (track and field) at the 1964 Summer Olympics
South Korean male triple jumpers
Olympic athletes of South Korea
Place of birth missing (living people)
20th-century South Korean people